Albert Simpson Shaw (March 1, 1881 – December 30, 1974) was a professional baseball player. He played all or part of five seasons in Major League Baseball, from 1907 to 1909 and 1914 to 1915. He was an outfielder for 418 of his 423 games played.

He finished his career with a .281 batting average, getting 434 hits in 1547 at bats. Shaw recorded 74 doubles and 28 triples, while hitting 14 home runs in 4+ seasons.

Sources

Major League Baseball left fielders
Major League Baseball center fielders
St. Louis Cardinals players
Brooklyn Tip-Tops players
Kansas City Packers players
Springfield Babes (baseball) players
Cedar Rapids Rabbits players
Springfield Senators players
Toronto Maple Leafs (International League) players
Jersey City Skeeters players
Toledo Iron Men players
Baseball players from Illinois
1881 births
1974 deaths